Jones Pharma is a specialty pharmaceuticals manufacturer and marketer based in St. Louis, Missouri. The company was founded on March 16, 1981 by Dennis M. Jones and Judith Pearce Jones under the name Jones Medical Industries. The company completed its initial public offering in 1986, trading under the ticker symbol JMED on the NASDAQ. The primary therapeutic compounds marketed by the company include Thrombin-JMI and Levoxyl. On May 30, 2000 the company became a wholly owned subsidiary of King Pharmaceuticals (NYSE:KG), based in Bristol, Tennessee. The market value of the company on its closing trade was $3.6 billion.  Parent company King Pharmaceuticals was acquired by Pfizer in 2010.

References

 Socha, Rudy & Darrow, Carolyn (2003). "Above and Beyond:  Former Marines Conquer the Civilian World", p. 110. Turner Publishing, Paducha. 
 Wall Street Journal Article Ranks Jones Pharma 23rd in Five-Year Return Among Top 1000 U.S. Companies Wall Street Journal Article Ranks Jones Pharma 23rd in Five-Year Return Among Top 1000 U.S. Companies
 King Pharmaceuticals merging with Jones Pharma in $3.4 Billion Deal thepharmaletter.com
 St. Louis Business Journal: He’s a multimillionaire who never went to college, yet within 20 years built Jones Pharma into a business that was acquired for $3.4 billion 
 Read more: Dennis Jones - St. Louis Business Journal

External links 
 jonespharma.org
 kingpharm.com
 Jones Medical Industries
 business.com

Pharmaceutical companies of the United States
Health care companies based in Missouri